Events from the year 1513 in France

Incumbents
 Monarch – Louis XII

Events
 6 June - French suffer defeat at the Battle of Novara during the War of the League of Cambrai
 16 August -Henry VIII defeated the French at the Battle of the Spurs
 Unknown - Louis XII commissions the Tour Royale in Toulon

Births
 30 October - Jacques Amyot, writer (died 1593)

References

1510s in France